The 2021 Elle Spirit Open was a professional women's tennis tournament played on outdoor clay courts. It was the fourth edition of the tournament which was part of the 2021 ITF Women's World Tennis Tour. It took place in Montreux, Switzerland between 6 and 12 September 2021.

Singles main-draw entrants

Seeds

 1 Rankings are as of 30 August 2021.

Other entrants
The following players received wildcards into the singles main draw:
  Jenny Dürst
  Alina Granwehr
  Valentina Ryser
  Joanne Züger

The following player received entry using as a special exempt: 
  İpek Öz

The following players received entry from the qualifying draw:
  Karola Bejenaru
  Melania Delai
  Fiona Ganz
  Sarah Beth Grey
  Malene Helgø
  Verena Meliss
  Tatiana Pieri
  Chiara Scholl

Champions

Singles

 Beatriz Haddad Maia def.  Francesca Jones, 6–4, 6–3

Doubles

  Estelle Cascino /  Camilla Rosatello def.  Conny Perrin /  Eden Silva, 7–6(7–4), 6–4

References

External links
 2021 Elle Spirit Open at ITFtennis.com
 Official website

2021 ITF Women's World Tennis Tour
2021 in Swiss tennis
September 2021 sports events in Switzerland
Montreux Ladies Open